This is a list of notable oyster bars. An oyster bar is a restaurant specializing in serving oysters, or a section of a restaurant which serves oysters buffet-style. In France, the oyster bar is known as bar à huîtres. Oysters have been consumed since ancient times and were common tavern food in Europe, but the oyster bar as a distinct restaurant began making an appearance in the 1700s.

United Kingdom
 Loch Fyne Restaurants – a chain of 25 seafood restaurants in the United Kingdom

England
 Bentley's Oyster Bar and Grill
 Sinclair's Oyster Bar – Cathedral Gates, Millennium Quarter, Shambles Square, Manchester city centre, Manchester, England

United States

California
 72 Market Street Oyster Bar and Grill – a former oyster bar and restaurant in Venice, California
 Swan Oyster Depot – in San Francisco, California

District of Columbia

 Hank's Oyster Bar – multiple locations in Washington, D.C. and Alexandria, Virginia
 Old Ebbitt Grill – a historic bar and restaurant located in Washington, D.C.; holds an annual oyster eating event called Oyster Riot every November

Florida
 Flora-Bama – located on Perdido Key in Pensacola, Florida; a world-famous honky-tonk, oyster bar, beach bar, and Gulf Coast cultural landmark
 Shuckum's Oyster Bar – a former restaurant located on Young Circle in downtown Hollywood, Florida

Louisiana
 Arnaud's – the largest restaurant in New Orleans

Massachusetts
 Union Oyster House, in Boston, Massachusetts, one of the oldest restaurants in America.

New York
 Grand Central Oyster Bar & Restaurant, a seafood restaurant located on the lower level of Grand Central Terminal at 42nd Street and Vanderbilt Avenue in Manhattan in New York City
 John Dory Oyster Bar – Manhattan, New York City
 Mermaid Oyster Bar –  in Greenwich Village, New York City opened by Zach Braff

North Carolina
 Sunny Side Inn – a historic oyster bar located at Williamston, Martin County, North Carolina

Oregon
 Dan and Louis Oyster Bar – a seafood restaurant in Portland, Oregon described by Fodor's as a "Portland landmark"
 Eat: An Oyster Bar
 Flying Fish Company
 McCormick & Schmick's – an American seafood restaurant chain, based in Portland, Oregon

Pennsylvania
 Old Original Bookbinder's and Bookbinder's 15th Street - old, iconic Philadelphia seafood restaurants (Original dates to 1893), now both closed.

Virginia
 Old Original Bookbinder's – Richmond, Virginia- expansion from Philadelphia.

Washington
 Coastal Kitchen, Seattle
 Emmett Watson's Oyster Bar – located in Seattle, Washington's Pike Place Market
 The Walrus and the Carpenter, Seattle

Gallery

See also

 List of seafood restaurants
 Lists of restaurants
 Raw bar

References

Bibliography
 Williams, Nicola. France. London: Lonely Planet, 2009.

Further reading
 
 

 
Lists of restaurants